BAE Panther may refer to:

 Iveco LMV, a small armoured vehicle supplied to the British Army branded as a BAE product
 RG-33, Medium Mine Protected Vehicle